Uriah or Uriyah is a Hebrew given name. It may refer to:

People

In the Bible
Uriah the Hittite, a soldier in King David's army in the Books of Samuel
Uriah, a priest under Ahaz in the Books of Kings
Uriah (prophet), a prophet murdered by Jehoiakim in the Book of Jeremiah
Uriah, a priest and the father of Meremoth in the Book of Ezra (8:33) and Book of Nehemiah (3:4, 21)
Uriah, a priest whom God offers to call as a witness in the Book of Isaiah (8:2)

Other people
Uriah F. Abshier (1849-1934), American politician and businessman
Uriah Asante (1992–2016), Ghanaian footballer
Uriah Duffy (born 1975), American bassist
Urijah Faber (born 1979), American mixed martial arts fighter
Uriah Hall (born 1984), Jamaican mixed martial arts fighter  
Uriah P. Levy (1792–1862), American naval commander
Uriah Rennie (born 1959), English football referee
Uriah M. Rose (1834–1913), American lawyer
Uriah Smith (1832–1903) American photographer
Uriah Smith Stephens (1821–1882), American labor leader
Uriah Tracy (1755–1807), American politician

Other uses
Uriah, Alabama, unincorporated community, United States
Uriah Heep, fictional character in the 1850 novel David Copperfield by Charles Dickens
Uriah Heep (band), British rock band
Uriah Pedrad, fictional character of the Divergent trilogy by Veronica Roth
Uriah, a supporting character in Half-Life 2: Episode Two

Hebrew masculine given names
English masculine given names